Effigy: Poison and the City is a 2019 historical thriller film about German 19th century female serial killer Gesche Gottfried, directed, co-written and co-produced by Udo Flohr, marking his directorial debut. The film is based on original trial records, as well as inspired by main screenwriter Peer Meter's stage play "The Interrogation of Gesche Gottfried".

The film had its world premiere at Filmfest Bremen on 21 September 2019.

Plot
1828 in the German port city of Bremen: Young Cato Böhmer arrives to take up her new position as a city clerk, assisting investigating judge Senator Droste at the criminal court. She strives to become an attorney – at a time when women aren't even admitted to universities. As the duo investigates an alleged poison attack reported by master miller Steitz, they encounter Gesche Gottfried, a suave and attractive widow known for her philanthropic attitude. Gottfried also appears to be in danger. However she soon turns out to be a prime suspect in a series of killings, the victims of which include her parents, her three husbands, her children and her twin brother, as well as friends and neighbors. While searching for evidence, Droste comes under increasing pressure from Bremen's bourgeoisie, especially Captain Ehlers who demands the senator's support for his steam shipping company. But Droste, like Mayor Johann Smidt, sees the future in the emerging railroad technology. Cato Böhmer is just barely able to fend off a political intrigue of the captain against her boss. Albeit with forensic proof of arsenic poisoning remaining elusive, she and the senator desperately need to obtain a confession from Gesche Gottfried.

Cast

Reception 

On the review aggregator website Rotten Tomatoes Effigy: Poison and the City holds a " fresh" rating, based on  reviews, representing a positive response from critics. The site's critical consensus reads, "Deftly filmed by director Udo Flohr, Effigy: Poison and the City offers an absorbing glimpse of history that should satisfy period drama fans."

References

External links
 
 
 

2010s German-language films
2010s historical drama films
2019 biographical drama films
2019 directorial debut films
2019 films
2019 thriller films
Biographical films about serial killers
Cultural depictions of female serial killers
Films based on biographies
Films set in 1828
Films set in the 19th century
Films shot in Germany
German biographical drama films
German historical drama films
German historical thriller films
Thriller films based on actual events
2010s German films